George Fitzgerald Cooper (born March 19, 1984) is a former American football tight end. He was signed by the Detroit Lions as an undrafted free agent in 2007. He played college football at Georgia Tech.

Cooper has also been a member of the Atlanta Falcons.

Early years
Cooper played high school football at Westerville North High School under former head coach Bob Cavin. He was a second-team all-state performer at Westerville North and was ranked as high as the No. 11 among the nation's tight end prospects.

College career
Cooper played tight end under Chan Gailey for the Georgia Tech Yellow Jackets. He had nine receptions for 113 yards and one touchdown in three seasons at Georgia Tech.

Professional career

Detroit Lions
Cooper was originally signed by the Detroit Lions as an undrafted free agent on May 4, 2007. He was waived by the team on June 14.

Atlanta Falcons
On September 3, 2007, Cooper was signed to the practice squad of the Atlanta Falcons, where he spent the entire season. On February 7, 2008, Cooper was re-signed to a future contract. He was waived on June 10, re-signed on August 4 and waived again on August 24 when the team signed veteran tight end Marcus Pollard.

Kenyon College
In Fall 2015 Cooper interned at Kenyon College though the National Football League Players Association’s (NFLPA) Coaching Internship program. Westerville, where Cooper played high school football, is 38 miles southwest of Kenyon.

References

External links
 Georgia Tech profile

1984 births
Living people
American football tight ends
Atlanta Falcons players
Detroit Lions players
Georgia Tech Yellow Jackets football players
People from Westerville, Ohio